The 1984–85 Danish 1. division season was the 28th season of ice hockey in Denmark. 14 teams participated in the league, and the Rødovre Mighty Bulls won the championship. Due to the league being reformed as the Eliteserien and the number of teams being reduced from 14 to seven for the following season, AaB Ishockey, IK Aalborg, KSF Copenhagen, Gladsaxe SF, Tårnfalkene, Skovbakken, and Rungsted IK were all relegated to the 2. division.

Regular season

Playoffs

1st-4th place

5th-8th place

Relegation
Vojens IK - Rungsted IK 3:2

External links
Season on eliteprospects.com

Dan
1984 in Danish sport
1985 in Danish sport